The Amory House is a historic house on the slopes of Mount Monadnock, on a private drive off Old Troy Road in Dublin, New Hampshire.  Built in 1898–99, it is a distinctive local example of a Dutch Colonial Revival summer country house.  The house was listed on the National Register of Historic Places in 1983.

Description and history
The Amory House is located on the grounds of the former Amory country estate, a large tract of land rising on the northern slope of Mount Monadnock between Old Troy Road to the west and the mountain's Pumpelly Ridge to the east. It is accessed via a private road that snakes across the historic estate.  The house is a rambling -story wood-frame structure, with multiple gambrel roof gables and a clapboarded exterior.  Some of the gables are adorned with half-round three-part windows, while one has an oriel window at its center.  A screened porch with round columns provides a fine view to the west.  A carriage house with similar styling stands nearby.

The house was built 1898–99 to a design by Boston architect John Lavalle.  It was built for Boston businessman William Amory, who died in 1900; his wife Louise built a much larger Italian villa nearby in 1910-11 (of which only the ballroom survives), and rented this house out.  Notable occupants of the house include United States Senator Albert J. Beveridge and historian Henry Adams.

See also
Amory-Appel Cottage, former chauffeur's house
Lattice Cottage, guest house
National Register of Historic Places listings in Cheshire County, New Hampshire

References

Houses on the National Register of Historic Places in New Hampshire
Colonial Revival architecture in New Hampshire
Houses completed in 1898
Houses in Dublin, New Hampshire
National Register of Historic Places in Dublin, New Hampshire